Timothy Kitum (born 20 November 1994) is a Kenyan middle distance runner. He also won Commonwealth Youth Games 800m with a Games Record 1.49.32

He won a silver medal in the 800 m at the 2012 World Junior Championships in Athletics in Barcelona, finishing second to Nijel Amos, before going on to win the bronze medal in the men's 800m race at the 2012 Summer Olympics.

References

External links

1994 births
Living people
Kenyan male middle-distance runners
Athletes (track and field) at the 2012 Summer Olympics
Olympic athletes of Kenya
Olympic bronze medalists for Kenya
Medalists at the 2012 Summer Olympics
Olympic bronze medalists in athletics (track and field)